Martin Potter (born 4 October 1944) is a British actor.

After the National Youth Theatre and repertory theatre in Guildford and Hampstead, Potter received his first role in British television at the age of 23 in the television drama The Bonegrinder (1968) written by Dennis Potter. In the same year he had another small part alongside Brian Cox in the futuristic drama The Year of the Sex Olympics.

One year later Potter's career took off with a much larger role. The Italian director Federico Fellini chose him for the main role of Encolpius in his film Satyricon. Terence Stamp, Fellini's original choice for the main role, was not available, and Fellini was looking for someone of a similar appearance.

After this star role, Potter's career tended back to smaller roles again: mostly B-films and television productions like the film adaptation of W. Somerset Maugham's Olive. Among his more well-known parts are the history film Nicholas and Alexandra (1971) and the film The Big Sleep (with Robert Mitchum as private detective Philip Marlowe). He also appeared in horror films, including Craze with Jack Palance, and television series such as Doctor Who. In 1975 he achieved some popularity with the title part of Robin Hood in a TV mini-series The Legend of Robin Hood. In 1985 he again took a part in a production concerning Ancient Rome: the American mini-series A.D. in which he portrayed the Roman politician and opponent of Nero, Gaius Calpurnius Piso.

Filmography

External links

1944 births
English male film actors
English male television actors
Living people
Actors from Nottingham
National Youth Theatre members